Lisa Elmaleh (born 1984) is an American photographer from South Florida.

Early life and education
Lisa Elmaleh was born in Miami, Florida in 1984.
She grew up in a small apartment with her mother on a limited income.
Her father was a photographer who worked with landscapes; Elmaleh recalls watching him develop photographs in a darkroom, saying "the magic of the images...stuck with me".
She attended the School of Visual Arts in Manhattan, graduating with a Bachelor of Fine Arts in 2007.

Career

Methods
Elmaleh creates tintype photographs, learning the collodion process in 2007.
Her preferred camera is the Century Universal; she uses a Schneider Kreuznach 300mm lens.
The wet collodion process means that images must be shot and developed while the chemicals are still wet on the plate.
Many of her photographs focus on Appalachian folk musicians.
She converted a Toyota Tacoma truck into a mobile darkroom—driving to meet her subjects.
Because of the time constraints of the collodion process, Elmaleh develops the photographs within thirty minutes of taking them. Images are taken and developed one at a time.

Awards and honors
2010: Artist in Residence at Everglades National Park
2011: Won the Aaron Siskind Foundation IPF Grant
2012: Won the Ruth and Harold Chenven Foundation Grant
2013: Named one of Photo District Newss "30 New And Emerging Photographers To Watch"
2015: Runner up for the Aperture Portfolio Prize
2022: Won the Arnold Newman Prize

Works
Some of Elmaleh's works include:
Everglades: a photo series of the natural environment of South Florida
American Folk: a photo series of Appalachian folk musicians

Personal life
She moved to Paw Paw, West Virginia from Brooklyn in 2014.

References

1984 births
Living people
American photographers
Artists from Miami
Harper's Magazine people
School of Visual Arts alumni
People from Morgan County, West Virginia
Photographers from Florida
21st-century American women photographers
21st-century American photographers